Phasianella nivosa is a species of sea snail, a marine gastropod mollusk in the family Phasianellidae.

Description
The shell grows to a height of 2 cm. The spire attains a moderate height with rounded whorls. The color of the shell has a pale to dark background with lighter, thick for thin, broken bands.

Habitat
This species is found on algae in the eulittoral zone.

Distribution
This species occurs in the Indian Ocean off Tanzania and Madagascar.

References

 Dautzenberg, Ph. (1929). Contribution à l'étude de la faune de Madagascar: Mollusca marina testacea. Faune des colonies françaises, III(fasc. 4). Société d'Editions géographiques, maritimes et coloniales: Paris. 321–636, plates IV-VII pp.

External links

Phasianellidae
Gastropods described in 1862